The E-Boat, was designed by Julian Everitt, and went into production in 1976 and there are in excess of 250 E-Boats built between 1976 and 1984 of which around one hundred and fifty were in the UK. She was designed to comply with IOR rules and is basically a 22 feet, four berth trailer sailer. The E-Boat Offshore One Design is a light displacement flush deck IOR Mini Ton keel-boat with a lifting cast iron keel, designed in 1974. Most boats sailing are in Great Britain, Ireland, The Netherlands and Denmark.

Specifications

I =

J =

P =

E =

Sailing details
Handicaps;	PHRF	= 252,	
		Portsmouth	= ,	
		IRC		= ,	
Class based Handicaps	VYC	= ,
CBH	= ,	
			Other	= ,	

Sailing Characteristics;
For sailing the keel is locked down with a mechanism and is as firmly located as in any fixed keel boat. The benefit of her light displacement is seen in her speed and she will comfortably out pace many larger yachts, despite her uncomplicated masthead rig. As with the majority of trailer-sailers (and many other modern designs), she has a relatively low ballast ratio and therefore lacks the stability of heavier and larger yachts. In the right hands and with some simple but important safety modifications she can be capable of safe offshore passages.

Notable Performances;

Accommodation
Number of crew to race  = 3 - 4, Berths = 4, Galley, Head = portable, Navigation = chart table, Maximum headroom = not standing, 
Accommodation is quite good for a boat of this size and is aided by the large beam. In fine weather three adults can live aboard comfortably, although she has 4 good sized berths. The twin cabin layout offers relatively good privacy, whilst the galley and chart table facilities are reasonable. Most boats carry a portable "chemical" toilet. The main difficulty is lack of headroom, improved by fitting a canopy for use at anchor. Around a dozen raised coach roof versions were built towards the end of the production run.

Special features
The wide flush decks and guardrails make access around the boat easy and relatively safe.

Construction
Boats were originally available either in kit form or fully fitted out.  
Country of origin, UK

Hull material, Ply (or Aluminium), GRP.

Manufacturer, Owner or boat builder

Plans availability, from the designer, Julian Everritt, Worthing, West Sussex, UK

References

Magazine "Trailer Sailing" 1985, No 3, page 83, Publisher Michael Hannan

External links
Association and photos

Trailer sailers